Henri P. Willems (born 30 September 1899, date of death unknown) was a Belgian bobsledder who competed during the early 1920s. He won a bronze medal in the four-man event at the 1924 Winter Olympics in Chamonix.

References

Bobsleigh four-man Olympic medalists for 1924, 1932–56, and since 1964
Wallenchinsky, David. (1984). "Bobsled: Four-Man". In The Complete Book the Olympics: 1896-1980. New York: Penguin Books. p. 559.

1899 births
Year of death missing
Belgian male bobsledders
Olympic bobsledders of Belgium
Bobsledders at the 1924 Winter Olympics
Olympic bronze medalists for Belgium
Olympic medalists in bobsleigh
Medalists at the 1924 Winter Olympics